American record producer, DJ, singer and songwriter Skrillex has released three studio albums, seven extended plays, 44 singles (including nine as a featured artist), and 23 music videos.

After departing the post-hardcore band From First to Last, he released his debut extended play, Gypsyhook, on April 7, 2009, through Atlantic Records as Sonny Moore. He then began producing music under the pseudonym Skrillex, released a second extended play, My Name Is Skrillex, as a free download from his Myspace page. The release was succeeded by a single, "Weekends!!!", featuring Sirah, which was released on October 25, 2010, in the United States. Skrillex rose to fame in late 2010 when he released a third EP, Scary Monsters and Nice Sprites on October 22 through labels mau5trap and Big Beat Records. The release saw moderate success, peaking at number 49 on the Billboard 200 and receiving an award for Best Dance/Electronica Album at the 54th Grammy Awards. The album's title track, also released as the lead single, saw international acclaim, receiving an award for Best Dance Recording at the aforementioned ceremony, and peaking at number 69 on the Billboard Hot 100. Moore's remix of "Cinema" by Benny Benassi also won a Grammy Award for Best Remixed Recording, Non-Classical.

On June 7, 2011, Skrillex released a fourth EP, More Monsters and Sprites, which primarily featured remixes of previous tracks. The release charted in the lower regions on the Billboard 200, spawning the singles "First of the Year (Equinox)", which reached number 85 on the Hot 100 and "Ruffneck (Full Flex)" which peaked at number 89 in the United Kingdom. In December 2011, Skrillex released Bangarang, a fifth EP, featuring collaborations with The Doors, Ellie Goulding and Wolfgang Gartner. Bangarang has since become his most commercially successful EP, peaking at number 15 on the Billboard 200, number six in Canada, number 31 in the United Kingdom, and number four in Australia. His sixth EP, Leaving, was released on January 2, 2013, exclusively to The Nest. Skrillex released his first studio album Recess in March 2014. In 2015 Moore collaborated with Diplo under the name Jack Ü, releasing a self-titled album in February of that year. On February 17 and 18, 2023, Skrillex successively released two new albums, Quest for Fire and Don't Get Too Close.

Studio albums

Extended plays

Singles

As lead artist

As featured artist

Other charted songs

Other appearances

Remixes

Music videos

As lead artist

As featured artist

With Dog Blood

Extended plays

Singles

Remixes

With Jack Ü

Production credits

Notes

References

External links
 
 
 
 

Discographies of American artists
Electronic music discographies